Harry Bradshaw (9 October 1913 – December 1990) was a leading Irish professional golfer of the 1940s and 1950s.

Bradshaw was born in Delgany, County Wicklow. He was the son of the Delgany professional golfer Ned Bradshaw and he and his three brothers Jimmy, Eddie and Hughie all became professional golfers. He represented Ireland in the Triangular Professional Tournament in 1937 and Llandudno International Golf Trophy in 1938. He won the Irish PGA Championship 10 times between 1941 and 1957, tied with Christy O'Connor Snr for most wins in that event. He was also the Irish Open champion in 1947 and 1949. He teamed with Christy O'Connor to win the Canada Cup for Ireland in Mexico in 1958, finishing second in the individual section of the event despite suffering nosebleeds due to the altitude. Bradshaw played in the Ryder Cup in 1953, 1955 and 1957. He was twice Dunlop Masters champion, in 1953 and 1955.

Bradshaw lost the 1949 The Open Championship following a playoff against Bobby Locke at Royal St George's, after an extraordinary incident in the second round when his drive at the 5th hole came to rest against broken glass from a beer bottle on the fairway. Rather than taking a drop (to which he would probably have been entitled) Bradshaw elected to play the ball as it lay, but was only able to move it slightly forward, dropping the shot. The setback resulted in his tying with Locke with an aggregate of 283, thereby equaling the championship record. However he lost the playoff to Locke. Arguably the incident with the bottle cost Bradshaw the tournament. He died in December 1990.

Tournament wins (21)

European Circuit wins (5)

Other wins (16)
1941 Irish PGA Championship
1942 Irish PGA Championship
1943 Irish PGA Championship
1944 Irish PGA Championship
1947 Irish PGA Championship
1950 Irish PGA Championship, Irish Dunlop Tournament
1951 Irish PGA Championship, Irish Dunlop Tournament
1952 Dunbar Open Tournament
1953 Irish PGA Championship
1954 Irish PGA Championship
1955 Gleneagles-Saxone Foursomes Tournament (with Joe Carr)
1957 Irish PGA Championship
1958 Irish Dunlop Tournament (tie with Norman Drew), Canada Cup (with Christy O'Connor Snr)

Playoff record
PGA Tour playoff record (0–1)

Results in major championships

Note: Bradshaw only played in The Open Championship.

CUT = missed the half-way cut
"T" indicates a tie for a place

Team appearances
Ryder Cup (representing Great Britain): 1953, 1955, 1957 (winners)
Canada Cup (representing Ireland): 1954, 1955, 1956, 1957, 1958 (winners), 1959
Triangular Professional Tournament (representing Ireland): 1937
Llandudno International Golf Trophy (representing Ireland): 1938
Joy Cup (representing the British Isles): 1954 (winners), 1955 (winners), 1956 (winners), 1958 (winners)
Slazenger Trophy (representing Great Britain and Ireland): 1956 (winners)
Amateurs–Professionals Match (representing the Professionals): 1956 (winners), 1957 (winners), 1958

References

Irish male golfers
Ryder Cup competitors for Europe
Sportspeople from County Wicklow
1913 births
1990 deaths